i.Scribe is a portable and cross-platform e-mail client for Microsoft Windows, Linux and Mac OS X with some PIM functionality.

Scribe comes in a freeware version: i.Scribe, which is limited to one account and 5 user defined filters and a commercial version: InScribe. The commercial version adds unlimited accounts and user defined filters.

Originally released as freeware in 1999, i.Scribe was released and renamed as a commercial product InScribe in 2003. Development of both software continues from the same source. Version 2.0 of the software is slated to include a rewrite of the mail database back end. Either product is sometimes referred to as just 'Scribe'.

Scribe uses the HTML layout engine from Lgi that is virus safe. Executable attachments are detected and optionally deleted. Translators have added translations to many popular European and East Asian languages. Scribe uses Unicode internally and can display text correctly even if the glyphs are not available in the current font.

References

External links

 PC World Review

Email clients